The Raptor Research Foundation (RRF) is a United States based ornithological society, focusing on the behavior, ecology, and conservation of birds of prey.  It was founded on 11 February 1966 as a non-profit scientific society with the primary goal of accumulating and disseminating scientific information about hawks, eagles, falcons and owls.  It publishes the quarterly journal The Journal of Raptor Research, as well as a newsletter, Wingspan.

The RRF makes two non-monetary awards; the Fran and Frederick Hamerstrom Award recognizes someone who has contributed significantly to the knowledge of raptor ecology and natural history, while the Tom Cade Award recognizes someone who has made significant advances in the captive propagation and reintroduction of raptors.  It also makes monetary grants to support raptor research.

The RRF is a member of the Ornithological Council.

References
 Raptor Research Foundation

Ornithological organizations in the United States
1965 establishments in Wisconsin
Organizations established in 1966
Raptor organizations